whatUwant was an Australian music video request television show that aired daily on Channel [V].

whatUwant first aired in April 2002 and broadcast over 1500 episodes. On 13 October 2008, Foxtel revealed that the show would close on 7 November 2008.

The show was directed by Bernie Zelvis and past hosts include Yumi Stynes, Australian Idol hosts Andrew G and James Mathison, and James Kerley. whatUwant's  final line-up of hosts was Renee Bargh, Danny Clayton and Jane Gazzo.

See also

 List of Australian music television shows

References

Channel V Australia original programming
Australian music chart television shows
2002 Australian television series debuts
2008 Australian television series endings